This is a list of contestants who have appeared on the reality television competition The Voice of Ireland. In its two years running, two artists have been so far granted the title of "The Voice of Ireland" – Pat Byrne and Keith Hanley respectively. There were 48 contestants on its first series, 49 contestants on its second series and 41 contestants on its third series.

Contestants

Notes
A Originally from Kian Egan's team.
B Originally from Bressie's team.
C Originally from Dolores O'Riordan's team.

Voice of Ireland contestants, The